The Toulouse Space Centre (CST) is a research and development centre of CNES. Founded in September 1968, it is located in the Rangueil-Lespinet district of Toulouse in the Haute-Garonne department in the Occitanie region in France. More than 1,700 employees are responsible for the development of most of the work for which CNES is responsible, with the exception of launch vehicles and their launches.

See also

References

External links 
 Official site of CNES
 « Le Centre spatial de Toulouse », in Le CNES, moteur de la politique spatiale de la France et de l'Europe, .

Space technology research institutes
CNES